The Canje River (sometimes referred to as Canje Creek), located in northeastern Guyana, is the main tributary of the Berbice River.  It runs roughly parallel to the Atlantic Ocean coast in East Berbice-Corentyne, region 6. 

The settlement of Baracara is on the Canje. It was settled by escaped slaves in the 1800s, and the river is still an important mode of transportation.

History 
The Dutch established an outpost, Concordia Post, on the river. In 1763 a slave revolt began on two plantations on the Canje River.

Economics 
The Canje River supplies water to the Guyana Sugar Corporation's Skeldon Estate (c. 12,000 acres (49 km2)); Albion Estate (20,000 acres (80 km2)); and Rose Hall Estate (12,000 to 14,000 acres (49 to 51 km2)). The Manarabisi Rice Cultivation (17,000 acres (69 km2)) and Black Bush Polder (17,000 acres (69 km2)) also depend on this river.

Pumps have been placed along the Canje River that lead to the cultivation area. There are two pumps at Skeldon. When all these pumps are in operation during the irrigation season, the level of water in the Canje River drops and a  sufficient volume of water cannot be supplied. At this point, the gate on the Berbice River end of the Torani Canal is opened to allow for flow into the Canje Creek.

In addition to agriculture, the land of the Canje basin has been of some interest by international firms for production of biofuel.

Fauna 
Guyana's national bird, the hoatzin, also known as the Canje pheasant is named for its presence in the river.

References 
Rivers of Guyana